The Christmas Train is a fiction novel written by David Baldacci. The book was initially published on October 17, 2003 by Grand Central Publishing. The book was adapted into a TV movie by the same name and released on the Hallmark Channel for the 2017 Christmas season.

References

External links

2003 American novels
Novels by David Baldacci
Christmas novels